The Somerset Guardian and Frome Standard are two weekly local newspapers, published in Somerset, England.

The Somerset Standard & Guardian Series consists of the Frome Standard, and the Somerset Guardian.

It is owned by Bath News & Media In 2012, Local World acquired Bath News & Media owner Northcliffe Media from Daily Mail and General Trust.

References

Northcliffe Media
Newspapers published in Somerset